Agnee 2 is a 2015 Bangladeshi-Indian action film directed by Iftakar Chowdhury. It is the second installment in the Agnee film series and serves as a sequel to Agnee (2014). The film stars Mahiya Mahi, Om Sahani, and Ashish Vidyarthi in lead roles.
Om has played the lead role here in this movie in place of Arifin Shuvoo and opposite Mahiya Mahi. Mahi is the only actress from the previous film to appear in Agnee 2.

After the initial success of Agnee (2014), production company Jaaz Multimedia announced the production of the sequel. Although the film was originally scripted with the cast from previous film, the film stalled for a while due to lead actor Arifin Shuvoo pulling out of the film due to professional difference and scheduling issues. Director Iftakar Chowdhury later roped Indian actors Ashish Vidyarthi for the negative role and Om for male lead. The film is produced by Abdul Aziz, his production company Jaaz Multimedia funded approximately 70% of the film's budget while Eskay Movies funded the rest. The film was released on July 18, 2015, in Bangladesh during Eid weekend by Jaaz Multimedia and August 14, 2015, in India by Eskay Movies. Majority of the film took place in Thailand.

Agnee 2 was released by Jaaz Multimedia on July 18, 2015, in Bangladesh and released by Eskay Movies in West Bengal, India on August 14 and Australia on August 25. Upon release, the film received mixed to negative reviews.

Plot
After defeating Gulzar and his gang to avenge father's death, Tanisha returns to Bangladesh with Sishir to live normal lives again. Sishir, Tanisha's boyfriend, once a deadly assassin and a member of Gulzar's crime syndicate who later turns good and Tanisha to avenge her father's death. Sishir decides to permanently return to Bangladesh for Tanisha but fails to return to Tanisha as Python, Gulzar's brother  and leader of a large crime syndicate kills him to take revenge for Brother's death. Saddened by the death of Sishir, Tanisha vows to kill Python, even at the cost of her life, however, Python's real identity is hidden from the outside world, therefore, she doesn't know who or where he is. Tanisha decides to trace Python's location by tracking the movements and activities from other infamous criminals. Tanisha traces python's location to Thailand and decides to go to Thailand.

Tanisha comes across a criminal Eshan, whose identity is concealed from her, however he knows her identity and her intention behind coming to Thailand. Eshan is a member of Python's crime organization. As he spends more time with her, Eshan falls in love with Tanisha while she is looking to kill him. Expecting nothing in return, Eshan vows to help Tanisha take revenge on Python and also decides to turn himself afterward. Still in love with her late lover, who she once decided to spend her life with, Will Tanisha accept Eshan's love, or will she take fully revenge for the death of Sishir by killing Eshan, who Tanisha believes is involved in death of Sishir? or is he someone else? A huge twist during Climax will leave audience astonished.

Cast
 Mahiya Mahi as Tanisha aka Agnee
 Om Sahani as Ishan
 Ashish Vidyarthi as Golden Triangle King Nilkantha Nag aka Python
 Amit Hasan as Interpol officer Mithun Sarkar
 Kharaj Mukherjee
 Kaushik Benerjee
 Supriyo Dutta 
 Raja Dutta
 Arifin Shuvoo as Shishir/Dragon (Archive Footage)
 Tiger Robi

Production
After initial success of Agnee, production company Jaaz Multimedia immediately announced the sequel and retained same leading cast. However, the leading actor Arifin Shuvoo dropped out of the project shortly after due to scheduling and personal indifference with the management. The principal photography for the film began in January 2015 and Om was signed to play the male lead while Tiger Robi and Ashish Vidyarthi was signed for negative role. The film's first lot of shooting began in Thailand until April. Rest of the film was shot in Bangladesh while several shots were taken in India.

Casting
Mahiya Mahi continued her role while almost the entire cast of Agnee had not seen in the sequel. Raja Goswami Om was roped to play the male lead role.

Soundtrack
The film soundtracks were very well received by audiences. The album received critical and commercial success. The soundtrack album consists of five tracks. The film's first track titled Magic Mamoni was first released on Jaaz Multimedia's official YouTube channel on June 4, 2015. The track was seen more than million times on YouTube in first week, becoming the fastest Bangladeshi film to cross million views mark. The track was composed by Savvy and sung by Neha Kakkar. The film's second track Ek Khan Chumu was released online on 11 June 2015. The track was sung by Benny Dayal. Another track titled Allah Jaane was released on June 18, 2015, while the last and album's only romantic track Tore Khuji was released on July 12, 2015.

Track listing

Release
Agnee 2 was released in 104 theaters screens in Bangladesh on Eid-Ul Fitr, 18 July 2015. The film was distributed in Bangladesh under the banner of Jaaz Multimedia. The film was also scheduled to release in India on the same day, however the release date was later postponed to August 14, 2015. The film was released in West Bengal, India in 45 theaters distribution of Eskay Movies. The film was released in Australia on August 23, 2015.

Critical reception
The film received mixed to negative reviews from critics. Film critics and audiences criticized the movie for its illogical story and screenplay. The film had some geographical and continuity error which was heavily criticized. Another negative side of the film was objectification of women and also there are some illogical concepts like charging cellphone in the sand near a sea was shown in this film. Audiences and critics heavily criticized these kinds of negative sides and concepts.
Bangladeshi film rating website bioscopeblog.net gave the film 2.5 out of 5 stars.

Sequel
During the release of Agnee 2, Director Iftakar Chowdhury officially announced the third installation titled Agnee 3. The film will retain Mahiya Mahi as the lead female role.

References

Further reading

External links
 

2015 films
2015 crime thriller films
2010s Bengali-language films
Bengali-language Bangladeshi films
Bangladeshi crime thriller films
Films set in Bangladesh
Films set in Dhaka
Films set in Thailand
Films scored by Savvy Gupta
Bangladeshi sequel films
Films shot in Thailand
Bangladeshi films about revenge
Jaaz Multimedia films